The Dark: Nature's Nighttime World is a three-part nature documentary series produced by the BBC Natural History Unit which follows an expedition to Central and South America to film animals at night. The presenting team is made up of biologist Dr. George McGavin, large mammal expert Bryson Voirin and wildlife filmmakers Gordon Buchanan, Sophie Darlington and Justine Evans. They are equipped with the latest low-light filming technology, including thermal imaging and infrared cameras, enabling them to film natural behaviour without disturbing the wildlife, even in pitch-black conditions. During the course of the six-month expedition, the team visit five countries (Costa Rica, Venezuela, Brazil, Peru and Chile) enlisting the help of local field scientists to locate and film rare species and new behaviour. The team obtain footage of nocturnal specialists such as vampire bats and owl monkeys and witness the nighttime activities of jaguars and pumas at close quarters.

The series was a co-production between the BBC, Discovery Channel and Terra Mater Factual Studios.  The executive producer for the BBC was Tim Martin, the series producer was Jonny Keeling and the score was composed by Jonathan Gunton. The series was produced and directed by Susanna Handslip, Rowan Musgrave and Will Ridgeon. It was first broadcast on BBC Two in the United Kingdom, starting on 29 July 2012, with a voiceover by Andy Serkis.

The Dark: Nature's Nighttime World is the fifth of the BBC Natural History Unit's "Expedition" series, following Expedition Borneo (2006), Lost Land of the Jaguar (2008), Lost Land of the Volcano (2009) and Lost Land of the Tiger (2010).

Episodes

DVDs
In United Kingdom, a single DVD (BBCDVD3602) has been released on 19 September 2012 by 2 Entertain.

References

External links

BBC TV Blog post by George McGavin

2010s British documentary television series
2012 British television series debuts
2012 British television series endings
BBC television documentaries
BBC high definition shows
Documentary films about nature